Giangiacomo Feltrinelli (19 June 1926 – 14 March 1972) was an influential Italian publisher, businessman, and political activist who was active in the period between the Second World War and Italy's Years of Lead. He founded a vast library of documents mainly in the history of international labour and socialist movements.
 
Feltrinelli is perhaps most famous for his decision to translate and publish Boris Pasternak's novel Doctor Zhivago in the West after the manuscript was smuggled out of the Soviet Union in the late 1950s. He died violently under mysterious circumstances in 1972.

Early life
Giangiacomo Feltrinelli was born in 1926 into one of Italy's wealthiest families, perhaps originating in Feltre. His father, Carlo Feltrinelli, controlled numerous companies including Credito Italiano, Edison S.p.A. and Legnami Feltrinelli, which managed vast lumber holdings in central Europe, some having provided sleepers for the enormous extension of Italian railway tracks in the nineteenth century. Carlo died in 1935. At the instigation of Giangiacomo's monarchist mother, Giannalisa, Italian dictator Benito Mussolini had him created Marchese di Gargnano at the age of 12 by King Vittorio Emmanuele III. Feltrinelli's mother married in 1940 Luigi Barzini, editor of the Italian newspaper Corriere della Sera. During the Second World War, the family left the Villa Feltrinelli in Gargnano, north of Salò, to be occupied by Mussolini, and moved to Monte Argentario.

World War II
The young Feltrinelli first took an interest in the living conditions of the poor and working class during discussions with the staff who ran his family's estate. He came to believe that under capitalism most people could never attain his privileges and were compelled to sell their labour for a pittance to industrialists and landowners. During the latter stages of the war, Feltrinelli joined the Legnano Combat Group and enrolled in the Italian Communist Party (PCI), fighting the invading German Wehrmacht and the remnants of Mussolini's Fascist regime.

In the post-war period, the PCI had a great deal of popular support and political influence; after 1948 it became the main opposition. Italy was in economic ruins and the party's previous opposition to Mussolini had gained it great popularity. The PCI was in coalition until 1947.

Inheritance
Carlo Feltrinelli's will made Giangiacomo heir to three-quarters of his assets, which came fully under his control when he reached the age of 21 in 1947. Banca Unione (formerly Banca Feltrinelli) was controlled by Giangiacomo until 1968, when it was acquired by Michele Sindona. According to some interpretations, Sindona was pushed to buy out Feltrinelli by the Vatican Bank, a minority shareholder embarrassed by cohabitation with a communist partner.

Library
From 1949 Feltrinelli collected documents for the Giangiacomo Feltrinelli Library in Milan, documenting the history of ideas, in particular those related to the development of the international labour and socialist movements. The Library later became an Institute; later still the Giangiacomo Feltrinelli Foundation, possessing some 200,000 rare and modern books, extensive collections of newspapers and periodicals (both historical and current), and over a million primary source materials.

Publishing
Near the end of 1954, Feltrinelli established a publishing company in Milan, Giangiacomo Feltrinelli Editore. Its first published book was the autobiography of Jawaharlal Nehru, the first prime minister of India.

Dr. Zhivago
In late 1956, an Italian journalist showed Feltrinelli the manuscript of Doctor Zhivago by the Russian writer Boris Pasternak. Feltrinelli's Slavist advisor told him to publish the novel, stating that to not do so would "constitute a crime against culture". His son Carlo's biography of Feltrinelli records a correspondence between him and Pasternak as they successfully resisted clumsy attempts by the Soviet regime to halt publication of the novel. Doctor Zhivago immediately became an international bestseller. 

Feltrinelli sold the film rights to Metro-Goldwyn-Mayer for $450,000. Produced in 1965, the resulting adaptation became one of the highest-grossing and critically acclaimed films of all time. The communist leadership in Moscow, which had not wanted the book published, criticised Feltrinelli, who in turn decided not to renew his PCI membership in 1957.  While Feltrinelli remained on good terms with the PCI, party leaders were reluctant to be seen to condone criticism of the Soviet Union.

The Leopard
Feltrinelli Editore scored another coup in 1958 when it published a book rejected by every other significant Italian publisher: The Leopard by Giuseppe Tomasi di Lampedusa. Described by some as the greatest novel of the twentieth century, The Leopard centres on the Sicilian nobility during the Risorgimento of the mid-19th century, when the Italian middle class rose violently and formed a united Italy under Giuseppe Garibaldi and the House of Savoy.

Despite these successes, Feltrinelli Editore lost about 400 million lire a year on a turnover of 1.207 billion lire, as Feltrinelli believed in keeping his prices low for maximum readership access. Still, the Feltrinelli Libra bookstore chain had a nominal capital of 120 million lire in 1956. The following year, Feltrinelli built up a chain of retail outlets which after his death became the largest in Italy; it had over a hundred bookshops. Feltrinelli Masonite, which he chaired, had a turnover of 1.421 billion lire in 1965. Another firm which he advised on real estate development had a capital of 400 million lire in 1970. So ample funds were available from Feltrinelli's other investments.

Whatever his own reading tastes, Feltrinelli was always keen to promote the avant-garde, including the works of the influential literary circle Group 63. He also took the risk of publishing and distributing novels banned under Italian obscenity laws, such as Henry Miller's Tropic of Cancer.

In 1960 Feltrinelli married German photographer Inge Schönthal, which produced a son named Carlo. Inge eventually became the de facto head of Feltrinelli Editore as Feltrinelli came to devote himself to clandestine political activity, of which she disapproved. Mother and son still run the publishing house together today.

Activism
In the post-war period, Feltrinelli had joined the Italian Socialist Party (PSI) before returning to the PCI, which he left again in 1957.

Third world activism
Feltrinelli spent the 1960s travelling the world and making links with various radical Third World leaders and guerrilla movements. In the Cuban house of the photographer Alberto Korda, Feltrinelli saw and was given Korda's iconic photo of Che Guevara. Within six months of Che's assassination, Feltrinelli sold over two million posters bearing the image. In 1964, Feltrinelli met Cuban prime minister Fidel Castro. In 1967 he went to Bolivia and met with Régis Debray.

Feltrinelli published the writings of figures such as Castro, Che and Ho Chi Minh, and a series of pamphlets on the unfolding insurgencies and wars in Southeast Asia and the Middle East. He was a close friend of the student leader Rudi Dutschke, whom he invited to convalesce in Italy after Dutschke was seriously wounded by an assassination attempt. Feltrinelli gave financial support to the Palestine Liberation Front, among other causes.

Guerilla activity
In 1968 Feltrinelli went to Sardinia to make contact with left-wing and separatist groups on the island, intending to make Sardinia a socialist republic similar to Cuba and "liberate it from colonialism". His attempt to strengthen Graziano Mesina's rebel forces was eventually nullified by Italian military intelligence.

Feltrinelli increasingly advocated guerrilla activity in Italy on behalf of the working class. In 1970, fearing a right-wing coup d'etat, he founded the militant Gruppi di Azione Partigiana (Partisan Action Groups, or GAP). GAP would become Italy's second-largest militant organization to be formed during the Years of Lead, after the Red Brigades. Anticipating assassination attempts by the CIA or Mossad, Feltrinelli assumed a nom de guerre ("Osvaldo") and went underground.

Death
On 15 March 1972, Feltrinelli was found dead at the foot of an electricity pylon at Segrate, near Milan, apparently killed by an explosive device he and other GAP members were planting the day before. Some 8,000 people attended Feltrinelli's funeral. His death, like his father's 37 years before, was viewed as suspicious by several intellectuals, including investigative journalist Camilla Cederna, but Barzini rejected the hypothesis of a state-sponsored assassination:

In 1974 an audio recording found in a shelter of the Red Brigades described Feltrinelli as 

In 1979, during an anti-terrorist trial, the Red Brigades defendants read into the court record a signed statement that Feltrinelli

The defendants denied the thesis of the murder, claiming it was a commemoration of the publisher and his political ideas, and a critique addressed to the circles of the extra-parliamentary left who had tried to deny them. They also admitted that Feltrinelli was not obsessed with a neo-fascist coup, because he wanted to establish in Italy the armed struggle and was one of the first to have had contacts with the German Red Army Faction: finally they affirmed that the relationships between GAP and RB were characterized by the maximum correctness, without competitive spirit.

The trial ended with eleven convictions, seven acquittals, two prescriptions and nine amnesties (this legal sentence was largely confirmed in 1981).

In cultural memory
 Senior Service, by Carlo Feltrinelli, 2001. This lengthy biography, written by Giangiacomo's son Carlo, was first published in Italian, and then translated into English.
 Feltrinelli, an 80-minute documentary by Alessandro Rossetto, was released in 2006.
 Feltrinelli, played by Fabrizio Parenti, appears in the 2012 film Piazza Fontana: The Italian Conspiracy (Romanzo di una strage) by Marco Tullio Giordana. The film is about the 1969 bomb explosion in Milan's Piazza Fontana, the subsequent fall to his death from a police window of an anarchist suspect, and the putative murder of Luigi Calabresi, the investigating police commissioner. In the film he takes part personally in the discovery of Feltrinelli's body: Calabresi in reality directed the investigation from Milan.
 Feltrinelli's life story was the subject of the 2013 concept album and theatrical performance Praxis Makes Perfect by the group Neon Neon.
 Feltrinelli, his publishing, and his suspicious death are mentioned several times in The Flamethrowers, a novel by Rachel Kushner which is set during the Years of Lead.

See also

List of unsolved deaths

References

Further reading
 Gottfried Abrath, Der AugenBlick, historischer Tatsachenroman, Norderstedt 2015, ISBN 9 783734 746758.
  The American edition of Senior Service in the references.
 Knigge, Jobst C. (2010). Feltrinelli – Sein Weg in den Terrorismus, Humboldt University, Berlin.
 

1926 births
1972 deaths
Italian anti-capitalists
Italian anti-fascists
Italian book publishers (people)
Italian communists
Italian socialists
Italian Marxists
Deaths related to the Years of Lead (Italy)
Businesspeople from Milan
Italian publishers (people)
Deaths by improvised explosive device
Unsolved deaths
Italian military personnel of World War II
Unsolved murders in Italy
1972 murders in Italy